Anopheles barberi is a tree hole breeding mosquito mainly located in eastern North America. The larvae are predators of other mosquito larvae. It has been shown to be a vector of malaria in the laboratory, but it is not thought to be an important malaria vector in the wild.

References

  Walter Reed Biosystematic Unit Characteristics, Bionomics, Medical Importance
  GeoSpecies Knowledge Base University of Wisconsin

Diptera of North America
Insect vectors of human pathogens
Insects described in 1903
barberi